Thomas Owen Baxter (c. 1930 – 26 May 2014) was a New Zealand former rugby league footballer who represented New Zealand in twenty nine tests between 1949 and 1956. In 2007 he was named in the New Zealand Rugby League's Team of the Century.

Playing career
Baxter, an Auckland representative, first made the New Zealand national rugby league team in 1949. During the 1951 French rugby league tour of Australia and New Zealand, Baxter was selected to play for both Auckland and New Zealand at centre.  Baxter went on to play in twenty nine tests in the next seven years, scoring six tries. In 1955 he was made captain and led the Kiwis out on ten occasions, including on the 1955–56 tour of Great Britain and France.

In 1959 he was Western Districts (a combination of Mount Albert and Point Chevalier) player-coach and led the team to Auckland Rugby League Fox Memorial Trophy and Rukutai Shield victories as well as winning a national tournament held to celebrate the ARL's fiftieth anniversary and an 8–7 victory over the New South Wales Rugby League's previously unbeaten champion St. George Dragons side.

In 1964 Baxter was the coach of the new Howick senior team.

Awards
Baxter was inducted as a New Zealand Rugby League "Legend of League" in 1995 and is an Auckland Rugby League Immortal. Baxter was inducted into the New Zealand Sports Hall of Fame in 1996. 

In 2007 he was named in the New Zealand Rugby League Team of the Century at centre.

References

2014 deaths
New Zealand rugby league players
New Zealand national rugby league team players
Auckland rugby league team players
Rugby league centres
New Zealand national rugby league team captains
New Zealand rugby league coaches
Howick Hornets coaches
Richmond Bulldogs players
Rugby league players from Auckland